A funiculus or column is a small bundle of axons (nerve fibres), enclosed by the perineurium. A small nerve may consist of a single funiculus, but a larger nerve will have several funiculi collected together into larger bundles known as fascicles. Fascicles are bound together in a common membrane, the epineurium.

Funiculi in the spinal cord are portions of white matter.
Examples include:
 Anterior funiculus of the spinal cord
 Lateral funiculus of the spinal cord
 Posterior funiculus of the spinal cord
 Funiculus separans of the rhomboid fossa

References 

Neuroanatomy